The Streak was a period of 68 years, spanning from 1948 to 2015, in which Easton Area High School in Easton, Pennsylvania produced at least one individual district champion in the sport of high school wrestling.

From 1948 to 2015, Easton had 185 individual district wrestling champions, while never failing to have at least one champion, in any year. Competing in Pennsylvania's Eastern Pennsylvania Conference, a district that has long been regarded as one of the most competitive districts in the United States for the sport of wrestling, Easton High School's 68-year streak was considered to be a testament to the program's consistent excellence.

District champions by year 
Year
1982
Jack Cuvo (98)

1983
Jack *Cuvo (98)
Jody Karam (155)

1984
Jack Cuvo (98)
Mark Benton (105)
Brian McIntyre (126)
Jerry Hulbert (132)

1985
Jack *Cuvo (105)
Jerry Hulbert (138)
Jeff Karam (155)

1986
Trevor Purdy (126)
Mike Disora (132)

1987
Doug Hager (112)

1988
Moss *Grays (132)

1989
Moss *Grays (135)
Dave Disora (140)
Tony Rizzolino (152)

1990
Steve Calandra (130)
Moss Grays (145)
Dan Goffredo (171)

1991
Greg Geiger (140)

1992
Gino *Cerulli (103)

1993
Eric Thompson (160)

1994
Eric Thompson (160)

1995
Jamarr Billman (112)

1996
Willie Saylor (103)
Chris Kelly (112)
Gary Rute (119)
Bryan Snyder (125)
Jamarr Billman (130)
Rich Morris (135)
Eric Greshko (140)

1997
Chris Kelly (112)
Bryan Snyder (135)
Jamarr Billman (140)

1998
Gino Fortebuono (112)

1999
Matt Ciasulli (103)

2000
 Chad Sportelli (103)
 Jake Giamoni (135)
 Ryan Kilpatrick (171)

2001
 Chad Sportelli (103)
Matt Ciasulli (119)
 Dan Brown (140)
 Ryan Kilpatrick (160)
 Justin Mclennan (189)

2002
Alex Krom (103)
Matt Ciasulli (125)
Matt Lear (152)

2003
Seth Ciasulli (103)
Alex Krom (112)
Mike Rogers (140)

2004
Mike Rogers (152)
Sean Richmond (160)
Jason Groller (275)

2005
Jordan Oliver (103)
Brad Gentzle (119)
Alex Krom (135)
Zach Pizarro (189)

2006
Jordan Oliver (103)
Russ Souders (119)
Ju Ju Drummond (125)
Braylin Williams (140)

2007
Desmond Moore (103)
Kegan Handlovic (112)
Jordan Oliver (119)

2008
Kegan Handlovic (119)
Jordan Oliver (130)
Chris Wilson (215)

2009
Chris Wilson (215)
Justin Grant (285)

2010
Mitchell Minotti (130)
Joe Rizzolino (135)

2011
Joe Rizzolino (135)
Mitchell Minotti (140)

2012
Mitchell Minotti (145)
Tyler Greene (182)

2013
Robbie Rizzolino (132)
Evan DiSora (160)

2014
Elijah Brown (152)

2015
Evan Fidelibus (132)
Jimmy Saylor (145)

The end of the streak – 2016 
The Easton wrestling streak ended on February 27, 2016 when it failed to produce a district champion.

Years with only one champion 
Of the 68 years in the streak, there were 17 seasons in which the streak was sustained by just one champion:

1956
 Gino Delorenzo (147)
1957
Ted Sulkin (105)
1963
Ray Ferarro (115)
1966
Bob *Ferarro (130)
1967
Dwight Dansor (115)
1976
Bob Weaver (98)
1979
Dan Kasperkoski (HWT)
1987
Doug Hager (112)
1988
Moss *Grays (132)
1991
Greg Geiger (140)
1992
Gino *Cerulli (103)
1993
Eric Thompson (125)
1994
Eric Thompson (119)
1995
Jamarr Billman (112)
1998
Gino Fortebuono (112)
1999
Matt Ciasulli (103)
2014
Elijah Brown (152)

Notable wrestlers who contributed to the streak 
Bobby Weaver, Olympic Gold Medalist (1984), Two-time Olympian (1980, 1984), Olympic Alternate (1976), World Champion (1979), NCAA Division I All American (Lehigh)

Chuck Amato – Defensive Coordinator – Akron, Former Head Football Coach – NC State, former defensive coordinator – Florida State, Two-Time ACC Wrestling Champion (NC State)

Phil Richards – CEO of Northstar Resource Group

Jordan Oliver – Two-Time Division I NCAA Champion, Three Time NCAA Finalist, Four Time All American (Oklahoma State)

Jack Cuvo – Two-Time Division I NCAA Champion, Three-Time All American (East Stroudsburg)

Bryan Snyder – Two-Time Division I NCAA Finalist, Four Time All American (Nebraska), Current Associate Head Coach – Nebraska

Jamarr Billman – Three-Time Division I NCAA All American (Penn State/Lock Haven), Former Head Coach – Easton Area High School

Bob Ferraro – Division I NCAA Finalist (Indiana State), former head coach, Bucknell University

Barry Snyder – EIWA Champion (Penn State), NWCA Hall of Fame as an Assistant Coach at Easton, former head coach, Lafayette College

Mitchell Minotti – Two-time NCAA Division I All American (Lehigh)

Alex Krom – NCAA Division I All American (Maryland)

Dick DeWalt – EIWA Champion (Penn State)

Willie Saylor – Editor, FloWrestling, 2016 National Wrestling Journalist of the Year

Desmond Moore – MMA Fighter – America's Top Team

Justin Grant – Two-Time Olympic Trials Qualifier

References 

Sports in the Lehigh Valley
Wrestling in Pennsylvania
Scholastic wrestling
High school sports in Pennsylvania
Easton, Pennsylvania